Expedition 43 was the 43rd expedition to the International Space Station. It commenced on 11 March 2015 with the undocking of Soyuz TMA-14M, returning the crew of Expedition 42 to Earth and ended with the departure of Soyuz TMA-15M on 11 June 2015.

The Expedition 43 crew spent an extra "bonus month" on board pending investigation of the Progress M-27M cargo spacecraft failure. On June 8, 2015 ISS adjusted its orbit to move to a safe distance from a piece of orbital space debris.

This expedition also used the ISSpresso machine and tested a special cup designed to be drunk from in microgravity by using capillary flow. This was a further development of a zero gravity cup invented by astronaut Donald Pettit and tested on ISS in 2008. The new zero g coffee cup idea was further developed by a Fluid physicist at Portland State University among others.

Crew

Source Spacefacts

Yury Lonchakov was originally supposed to be the Flight Engineer 3. However, he resigned from the Russian Federal Space Agency on September 6, 2013, to take a position at Gazprom. He was also originally supposed to be the commander of Expedition 44.

View of Earth

Cupola view

See also

ISS year long mission

References

External links

 NASA's Space Station Expeditions page

Expeditions to the International Space Station
2015 in spaceflight